Eskerê Boyîk (born 1941) is a Yazidi Kurdish poet and writer. He was born into a Yazidi family at the village of Qundexsaz in Armenia. He went to school in his village and later in the village of Elegez. He continued his studies in economics in Yerevan, and graduated in 1966. He has written many articles in Armenian and Russian. He is noted for his review of Soviet Kurdish literature. In the 1960s, he began writing poetry and articles in Kurdish. He is now living in Germany.

See also 

Yazidis in Armenia

Books
Şiverê, Poem, Yerevan, 1966. 
Kulîlkên Çiya, Poem, Yerevan, 1975. 
Sinco keça xwe dide mêr, Play, Yerevan, 1980. 
Tîrênc, Poem, Yerevan, 1987. 
Mem û Zîn, Play, Roja Nû Publishers, Stockholm, 1989,  . 
Li Çiya, Short Story, Yerevan, 1991. 
Duaya Serê Sibê, Poem, 80 pp., Roja Nû Publishers, Sweden, 1997. 
Oda Çîrokan 1, Poems for Children, 104 pp., Roja nû Publishers, 1997,  . 
Kulîlkên Birîndar, Poem, 288 pp., Stockholm, 1998, . 
Govenda Herfan, Poems for Children, Stockholm, 2002.

Notes and references

German Yazidis
Armenian Yazidis
1941 births
Living people
Armenian emigrants to Germany
Armenian-language writers
Russian-language writers
Kurdish-language writers